Macon is a town in Macon County, Illinois, United States whose population was 1,177 at the 2020 census.

History
The city was named after Nathaniel Macon (1758–1837), American politician.

It was originally plotted in 1856 on land owned by the Illinois Central Railroad. Macon was officially incorporated as a city on April 19, 1869.

Geography
Macon is located in southern Macon County at  (39.709123, -89.000391).

Major highways
  U.S. Highway 51 leads north  to Decatur, the Macon county seat, and south   to Pana.

Demographics

As of the census of 2000, there were 1,213 people, 467 households, and 346 families residing in the city. The racial makeup of the city was 98.85% White, 0.25% African American, 0.33% Asian, and 0.58% from two or more races. Hispanic or Latino of any race were 0.58% of the population.

There were 467 households, out of which 36.6% had children under the age of 18 living with them, 60.6% were married couples living together, 9.2% had a female householder with no husband present, and 25.9% were non-families. 24.0% of all households were made up of individuals, and 12.2% had someone living alone who was 65 years of age or older. The average household size was 2.51 and the average family size was 2.98.

In the city, the population was spread out, with 26.0% under the age of 18, 6.3% from 18 to 24, 27.3% from 25 to 44, 21.4% from 45 to 64, and 19.1% who were 65 years of age or older. The median age was 40 years. For every 100 females, there were 88.9 males. For every 100 females age 18 and over, there were 84.4 males.

The median income for a household in the city was $40,917, and the median income for a family was $48,583. Males had a median income of $35,333 versus $22,917 for females. The per capita income for the city was $18,029. About 5.1% of families and 5.8% of the population were below the poverty line, including 5.8% of those under age 18 and 9.3% of those age 65 or over.

Sports

High school

On June 4, 1971, the Macon High School baseball team finished in second place at the Illinois High School Association championship tournament. Their unlikely run to the state tournament was documented in Chris Ballard's 2012 book, One Shot at Forever: A Small Town, an Unlikely Coach, and a Magical Baseball Season.

Brian Snitker, a member of that team, joined the Atlanta Braves as a player in 1977, was their third base coach, and in 2013 was named the manager of Atlanta's Triple-A Gwinnett Braves. In 2016, the Atlanta Braves named Snitker as their manager.

On May 27, 2006, Meridian High School State Champion Rodney Oyler was the first individual IHSA Illinois Boys State Champion in the open 800 meter run at O'Brien Stadium, Charleston, Illinois.

The Meridian Hawks won the 2009 Boys Class 1A Illinois High School Association State Basketball Championship.

Auto racing
Macon is the site of Macon Speedway, a 1/5 mile high-banked dirt oval track which has been in operation since 1946.

In 2006, the track saw a major decrease in spectator turnouts and the owner was having trouble keeping the track open.  In early 2007, Macon speedway was purchased by NASCAR drivers Tony Stewart, Ken Schrader, and Kenny Wallace. Since their purchase, parts of the track have been remodeled, including new fencing all around and fresh painted grandstands.

Notable people 

 Dale Connelly, co-host of Minnesota Public Radio's Morning Show, is a 1973 graduate of Macon High School
 Nelson G. Kraschel, governor of Iowa from 1937 to 1939, was born on a farm near Macon on October 27, 1889
 Brian Snitker, Manager of the Atlanta Braves baseball team, former professional baseball player, was a 1973 graduate of Macon High School.
 Toby Towson, NCAA Gymnastics Champion, coach and dancer was a 1965 graduate of Macon High School
 Art Wilson, (1885–1960), born in Macon, was a major league baseball catcher

References

External links

Cities in Illinois
Cities in Macon County, Illinois